Aadu Hint (birthname Adolf Edmund Hint; 10 January 1910, Külasema, Muhu Island – 26 October 1989, Tallinn) was an Estonian writer. Most of his books are related to dwellers, who are living on Estonian islands.

After studying in Lümanda and Kuressaare, he worked as a teacher.

From 1940 to 1947, he was a deputy in the Supreme Soviet of the ESSR. From second half of 1940s, he was a professional writer, and lived in Tallinn.

He was married to Debora Vaarandi (1916-2007) and Minni Nurme (1917-1994). He had eight children. Several amongst them are writers, e.g. Eeva Park.

He died in 1989. He is buried in the Kihelkonna Cemetery, Saare County.

Works
 1937: novel "Kuldne värav" ('The Golden Gate')
 1950: story "Angerja teekond" ('The Path of the Eel')
 1951-1966: four-part novel "Tuuline rand" ('Windy Shore', I-IV)

References

1910 births
1989 deaths
20th-century Estonian writers
Estonian male novelists
Estonian male short story writers
People from Muhu Parish
Soviet writers